Sotajumala (Finnish for "Wargod") was a Finnish death metal band from Jyväskylä, formed in 1998. The band has released four albums, two maxi singles, one single and one split EP (with Torture Killer). They have played a lot of shows in their home country, including Tuska, Jalometalli, Nummirock, Lutakko Liekeissä and Pellavarock festivals. In Finland the band has also toured with Nile, Misery Index and Grave as well as supported Obituary, Napalm Death and Vader at one-off shows. The band split-up in 2016.

History
Sotajumala was started by Tomi Otsala and Kosti Orbinski in 1998. In 2000 Arttu Romo, Pete Lapio, Jyrki Häkkinen and Harri Lastu joined the band, thus completing its first full line-up. In September 2001 the band recorded their first release entitled Sotajumala which eventually led to Woodcut Records signing the band. Guitarist Pete Lapio left the band shortly thereafter. Singer Harri Lastu also left the band in the late summer of 2002, due to personal issues and was soon replaced by '105' (Teijo Hakkola).

During fall 2002 the band entered Watercastle Studio to record four new songs which Woodcut released in early 2003 as Panssarikolonna. Drummer Arttu Romo and guitarist Jyrki Häkkinen left the band shortly after the release and session drummer Timo Häkkinen was hired to play on the debut album, which was to be recorded in the fall. Ex-guitarist Pete Lapio joined the band again during the summer.

Death Metal Finland, the band's debut album was recorded in September 2003 at Sam's Workshop in Jyväskylä. After its release in March 2004 the band played a short Scandinavian tour with Rotten Sound and Defleshed with another session drummer, Sami Järvinen. In June 2003 the band played Nummirock festival with bands such as Morbid Angel and Rotten Sound. More line-up changes occurred in August when Timo Häkkinen joined the band full-time and singer Teijo Hakkola was fired. Mynni Luukkainen joined as session singer and the band was able to continue playing shows. In spring 2005 Sotajumala played in Estonia and also did a three show mini-tour in Finland with Grave.

Two new songs were recorded in July 2005 to be released as a split with Torture Killer that October. After these sessions Mynni Luukkainen joined the band as a full-time member. The split CD entered the Finnish single charts at position 10. In August the band played at Jalometalli Metal Music Festival in Oulu.

Sotajumala entered studio once more in late summer 2007 to record their sophomore album, Teloitus, which was released in October 2007. Teloitus entered the Finnish album charts at position 17. This was the band's last album for Woodcut Records.

To support Teloitus Sotajumala played many shows in Finland, including a four show mini-tour with Nile and Deathchain (December 2007), Finnish Metal Expo (February 2008), Tuska Open Air Metal Festival (June 2008), Pellavarock and Jalometalli Metal Music Festival (August 2008) as well as numerous shows with local bands. They also supported Obituary in August at Nosturi.

As of December 2008 the band was writing material for a new album and announced that they will try not to play any shows before the album is completed. In Sotajumala's case this usually doesn't work as evident by their performance at Jalometalli Winterfest in February supporting Napalm Death already in February 2009. Their third album Kuolemanpalvelus was released on 26 May 2010.

Musical style
Musically, the band tends to lean toward the Cannibal Corpse/Florida style of death metal. Lyrical themes revolve around the military history of Finland and war stories in general. The band stresses, "Though the lyrics have their roots in war, they are not meant to provoke or create an image of fascist beliefs. So, Sotajumala does not take any stand with our lyrics to political or other ideologies."

Members

Final Members
Tomi Otsala - bass, backing vocals (1998-2016)
Kosti Orbinski - guitar (1998-2016)
Pete Lapio - guitar (2000-2002, 2003-2016)
Timo Häkkinen - drums (2004-2016)
Mynni Luukkainen - vocals (2005-2016)

Former Members
Harri Lastu - vocals (2000-2002)
Arttu Romo - drums (2000-2003)
Jyrki Häkkinen - guitar (2001-2003)
Teijo "105" Hakkola - vocals (2002-2004)

Timeline

Discography
Sotajumala - 2002 mcd
Panssarikolonna - 2003 mcd
Death Metal Finland - 2004 CD
Sotajumala / Torture Killer split - 2005 CD single and 7" vinyl
Kuolinjulistus - 2007 CD single
Teloitus - 2007 CD
Death Metal Finland Special Edition - 2008 double CD
Kuolemanpalvelus - 2010
Raunioissa - 2015

References

External links

Finnish musical groups
Finnish death metal musical groups
Musical groups established in 1998